eShop Inc. was an American computer software company acquired by Microsoft in 1996

eShop or e-shop may also refer to:

 Nintendo eShop, an online marketplace for the Nintendo 3DS and Wii U
 e-shop, online shopping